Fausto Montefiori (born March 16, 1906, date of death unknown) is an Italian boxer who competed in the 1928 Summer Olympics.

In 1928 he was eliminated in the second round of the featherweight class after losing his fight to the upcoming bronze medalist Harold Devine.

1928 Olympic results
Below is the record of Fausto Montefiore, an Italian featherweight boxer who competed at the 1928 Amsterdam Olympics:

 Round of 32: bye
 Round of 16: lost to Harold Devine (United States) by decision

External links
Olympic profile

1906 births
Year of death missing
Featherweight boxers
Olympic boxers of Italy
Boxers at the 1928 Summer Olympics
Italian male boxers
20th-century Italian people